Sir James Roberts (1848–1935) was a Yorkshire industrialist and businessman. He was born at Lane Ends, near Haworth, Yorkshire on 30 September 1848. He was one of eleven children of a weaver who became a tenant farmer.

Early life and education
Roberts attended the local school at Haworth, where he learnt to read and write. As a boy he knew Charlotte Brontë and heard her father preach. He left school at eleven to become a part-time millworker in Oxenhope, and two years later was apprenticed at William Greenwood's mill there. At the age of eighteen he became manager of the mill, and in 1873 he started his own business as a top-maker.

Personal life
On 14 May 1873 at All Saints' Church, Bingley, he married Elizabeth Foster (1852–1935).

His daughter Alice eloped with Norman Rutherford, a medical student, on 27 August 1902 marrying in Scotland. He became a war hero earning the DSO in 1917. On 13 January 1919 Rutherford shot and killed Major Miles Seton  who was seeing Alice while he was away. At his trial Rutherford was found guilty but insane and sent to Broadmoor. While in Broadmoor he wrote An Outline History of the Great War anonymously.

Business
In 1892 the well-known firm of Sir Titus Salt, Sons and Co went into voluntary liquidation and Roberts was one of a consortium of local businessmen who purchased the concern. Within eight years he was the sole owner. The business prospered markedly under his management.

As part of his business activities Roberts travelled extensively abroad. He went to Russia many times and learnt to speak Russian. But his business interests suffered badly as a result of the Revolution. This meant a visit to his bankers in London, where the bank official he met was TS Eliot. This is said to have given reference to the poet's reference in his poem The Waste Land to "a silk hat on a Bradford millionaire". Nevertheless, when his family sold the business (which failed to prosper thereafter) in 1920, it was for the sum of £2,000,000, a remarkably large sum in those days.

The public life of Roberts was also distinguished. In 1897 he became a member of the Urban District Council for Shipley, West Yorkshire, eventually becoming chairman of that council. He was also a member of the County Council for the West Riding of Yorkshire and a Justice of the Peace. In 1909 he was created a baronet in the King's Birthday Honours. He was a keen advocate of free trade and was the first chairman of the West Riding Free Trade Federation. He endowed a leaving scholarship at Bingley Grammar School and the chair of Russian at Leeds University. He also bought Haworth Parsonage, which was opened to visitors in 1928 as the Brontë Parsonage Museum. There is a Roberts Street in central Bradford and a Roberts Park in Saltaire.

Later life
In 1910 Sir James Roberts purchased Strathallan Castle from the Earl of Perth. Roberts retired to the south of England, whilst also maintaining Strathallan Castle in Scotland. As of 2021 the Roberts family still has Strathallan Castle which is rented as function and event space. He died in 1935. He was buried in Fairlight in East Sussex.

References

External links
Home Page: Strathallan Castle
Brontë Parsonage Museum website

1848 births
20th-century British businesspeople
English chief executives
1935 deaths
Baronets in the Baronetage of the United Kingdom
Businesspeople from Yorkshire
People from Haworth